Ville Ottavainen (born 12 August 2002) is a Finnish ice hockey player who plays for JYP in Liiga. He was selected 99th overall in the 2021 NHL Entry Draft by the Seattle Kraken.

Career 
In 2020 Ottavainen played for JYP as a loan from Kitchener Rangers. He played 22 games and put up 3 points. He was moved to play for KeuPa HT in Mestis for 2 games. There he put up 2 points.

In 2021 Ottavainen signed a 1-year deal with JYP.

International play
Ville Ottavainen had played 4 games in Finland U17 and put up 2 points.

Career statistics

Regular season and playoffs

Personal life 
Ottavainen's dad Risto Ottavainen is a retired hockey player who last played for Kiekko-Oulu in 2003.

Sources

External links
 

2002 births
Living people
Finnish ice hockey players
JYP Jyväskylä players
People from Oulu
Seattle Kraken draft picks